Newark Liberty International Airport Station (Newark Airport Rail Station, often announced simply as Newark Airport) is a railroad station on the Northeast Corridor (NEC) in Newark, New Jersey. The station provides access to Newark Liberty International Airport (EWR) via the AirTrain monorail which connects the station to the airport's terminals and parking areas. It is served by New Jersey Transit's (NJT) Northeast Corridor Line and North Jersey Coast Line and Amtrak's Northeast Regional and Keystone Service trains. The station, located in the Dayton neighborhood of the city, is accessible only by train. There is no direct pedestrian access, bus service, parking facility, or drop-off area, although all are available at the airport.

History 

The station opened on October 21, 2001. The  (equivalent to US$ in ) facility was funded through a surcharge on airline passengers. Construction and operation of the extension of the AirTrain Newark system from the airport to the station is funded by ongoing fees charged to train passengers who use the station.

It is owned by the Port Authority of New York and New Jersey (PANYNJ), the airport's operator, and therefore has a different design than other NJT and Amtrak stations, especially the signage, which is the same as used throughout the airport.

The Port Authority originally intended to name the station "Newark Airport" but changed it to "Newark Liberty International Airport" after the airport's renaming, which honors the victims of the September 11 attacks and the proximity of the airport to the Statue of Liberty.

Unlike most train stations, the facility was designed with no direct pedestrian access, bus service, parking facility, or drop-off area, although all are available at the airport.

Station layout and service

Northeast Corridor 
On the NEC, to the north, it is a 6-minute trip to Newark's Penn Station, where connections are available to the Port Authority Trans-Hudson (PATH) system to Jersey City, Hoboken and Lower Manhattan as well as the Newark Light Rail and regional bus services. Secaucus Junction, only served by NJ Transit trains, is 15 minutes away and offers connections to other NJT commuter lines in northern New Jersey and Metro-North Railroad's West of Hudson services. New York City's Penn Station, where connections are available to Long Island Rail Road and the New York City Subway, is a 30-minute trip. To the south, Trenton is a 40-minute trip, Philadelphia is a one-hour trip, and Washington, D.C. is a 3.5-hour trip.

AirTrain Newark 
Passengers connecting between the Northeast Corridor and AirTrain Newark must pass through faregates and pay a fee. This fee is included in the price of tickets with the station as the origin or destination (denoted with **EWR**) and the QR code on the ticket can be scanned at the faregate. Monthly pass holders who do not have Newark Airport as the origin or destination for their pass need to use a ticket vending machine (TVM) located on either side of the faregates to pay the fee.

Platform layout 
NJ Transit trains typically stop on the outer platform tracks, while Amtrak trains typically stop on the inner platform tracks. The two center tracks, which do not serve the station, are used by express NJ Transit trains, as well as Amtrak services that do not stop here (the Acela and long-distance services).

PATH extension proposal 

In September 2012, the Port Authority of New York and New Jersey announced that work would commence on a study to explore extending the PATH system to the station. The new station would be located at ground level to the west of the existing NJ Transit station. A storage yard for PATH trains would also be built. There would be a park and ride facility at the stop, with a new entrance to the surrounding Dayton neighborhood, and an overpass to the existing NJ Transit and AirTrain platforms.

In 2014, the PANYNJ proposed a 10-year capital plan that included the PATH extension, which was approved by the Board of Commissioners on February 19 of that year. However, in late 2014, there were calls for reconsideration of Port Authority funding priorities. The PATH extension followed the route of existing Manhattan-to-Newark Airport train service, while there was no funding for either the Gateway Tunnel under the Hudson River, or the replacement of the aging and overcrowded Port Authority Bus Terminal. On January 11, 2017, the PANYNJ released its 10-year capital plan that included $1.7 billion for the extension. Under the plan, construction was projected to start in 2020.

The PANYNJ announced in March 2023 that it was deferring funding for the Newark Airport extension to a future capital plan. At the same time, the PANYNJ's Board of Commissioners allotted $12 million to plan and design new entrances to the Newark Liberty International Airport station.

References

External links 

Newark Airport Amtrak & New Jersey Transit Station (USA RailGuide -- TrainWeb)

NJ Transit Rail Operations stations
Amtrak stations in New Jersey
PATH stations in New Jersey
Stations on the Northeast Corridor
Port Authority of New York and New Jersey AirTrain
Newark Liberty International Airport
Transportation in Newark, New Jersey
Airport railway stations in the United States
Railway stations in Essex County, New Jersey
Railway stations in the United States opened in 2001